Vught is a railway station located in Vught, Netherlands. It is situated on the Utrecht–Boxtel railway. The train services are operated by Nederlandse Spoorwegen, it was opened in 1868.

Train service
The following services currently call at Vught:
2x per hour local services (stoptrein) 's-Hertogenbosch - Eindhoven - Helmond - Deurne

External links
NS website 
Dutch Public Transport journey planner 

Railway stations in North Brabant
Vught